Hannes Dotzler (born 25 February 1990) is a German cross-country skier who has competed since 2006. His best World Cup finish was third in a 4 × 10 km relay event in Finland in March 2010.

In the 2013 Nordic World Ski Championships in Val di Fiemme he placed seventh at the men's 50 km classical.

He was trained by his father Stefan Dotzler.

Cross-country skiing results
All results are sourced from the International Ski Federation (FIS).

Olympic Games

World Championships

World Cup

Season standings

Individual podiums

1 podium

Team podiums

 1 podium – (1 )

References

External links

 
 
 
 
 

1990 births
German male cross-country skiers
Tour de Ski skiers
Living people
Cross-country skiers at the 2014 Winter Olympics
Olympic cross-country skiers of Germany
People from Sonthofen
Sportspeople from Swabia (Bavaria)